Iverian Mountain  or Iberian Mountain is a 344-meter (1129 feet) high hill in New Athos, Abkhazia, Georgia. There are ruins of the ancient capital of Abkhazia, Anacopia, on the mountain top. On the mountain northern slope New Athos Cave is located.

References

See also
Anacopia
New Athos
New Athos Cave Railway

Hills of Abkhazia